Más sabe el Diablo por viejo  is a 2018 Mexican comedy film directed by José Pepe Bojórquez, from a screenplay by Bojórquez, and Alfredo Félix-Díaz. It is an original story of Brad Hall, and Ty Granoroli. The film premiered on 26 July 2018 in Mexico, and is stars Osvaldo Benavides, and Sandra Echeverría.

Cast 
 Osvaldo Benavides as Teo
 Sandra Echeverría as Dafne
 Martín Altomaro as Red
 Arturo Barba as Hugo Bellamy
 Ignacio López Tarso as Joselito
 Isela Vega as Marilú Sáez
 Lorena Velázquez as Angélica Aguirre
 Tara Parra as Victoria Placeres
 Tina Romero as Nelly Durán
 Patricio Castillo as Rudy Macedo
 Roger Cudney as Stuart Young
 Juan Luis Orendain as Antonio Abud
 Lupita Sandoval as Enfermera Malena
 Tiaré Scanda as Conchita
 Rodrigo Abed as Famous

References

External links 
 

2018 films
Mexican comedy films
2010s Spanish-language films
2018 comedy films
American comedy films
Films directed by José Pepe Bojórquez
Spanish-language American films
2010s American films
2010s Mexican films